Little Rock Village was a Native American village of the Potawatomi people located on the north bank of the Kankakee River, at a site close to the current boundary between Kankakee and  Will counties of the state of Illinois in the United States. The location now lies within the present-day Kankakee River State Park, close to the mouth of Rock Creek on Kankakee River.

References

Native American populated places
Pre-statehood history of Illinois
Geography of Kankakee County, Illinois